Sadiq Adebiyi (born 8 January 1997) is a Nigerian professional rugby league footballer who plays as a  or  for the Keighley Cougars in the Championship and Nigeria at international level.

Adebiyi played for London Broncos between 2015 and 2021 with loan spells at  Hemel Stags, Oxford and London Skolars in League 1, and Oldham and the Sheffield Eagles in the Championship.

Background
Adebiyi was born in Lagos, Nigeria.

Playing career

London Broncos
Adebiyi made his debut for the Broncos in 2015 and was a member of the first team squad from 2017 until 2021. Injuries and the COVID-19 pandemic limited his opportunities in 2020 and 2021. In 2020 he suffered a pectoral injury that ruled him out for several months. In 2021, Adebiyi ruptured his Achilles tendon and missed most of the Championship season.

During the time at London he made 49 appearances scoring 11 tries.

Wakefield Trinity
On 15 October 2021 Adebiyi signed for Wakefield Trinity in the Super League  During the 2022 season he made three appearances for Trinity and spent a period on loan at Newcastle Thunder.

Keighley Cougars
Adebiyi joined Keighley on a two-year deal in October 2022.

International
Adebiyi represented Nigeria twice in 2019 captaining his national team as they won the MEA Championship.

References

1997 births
Living people
English people of Nigerian descent
English rugby league players
Hemel Stags players
Keighley Cougars players
London Broncos players
London Skolars players
Newcastle Thunder players
Nigerian rugby league players
Nigeria national rugby league team captains
Nigeria national rugby league team players
Oldham R.L.F.C. players
Oxford Rugby League players
Sportspeople from Lagos
Rugby league props
Rugby league locks
Sheffield Eagles players
Wakefield Trinity players